Liu Yang (Chinese: 刘洋; born 9 February 1991) is a Chinese football player who currently plays for Chinese Super League side Cangzhou Mighty Lions.

Club career
In 2011, Liu Yang started his professional footballer career with Shandong Luneng in the Chinese Super League. He would eventually make his league debut for Shandong on 29 October 2011 in a game against Shenzhen Ruby, coming on as a substitute for Han Peng in the 90th minute. Under the Head coach Henk ten Cate, Liu would start to become a regular within the squad, however the club finished in a disappointing twelfth in the 2012 Chinese Super League campaign and under the new manager Radomir Antić he would lose his place within the first team.  

On 30 December 2013, Liu transferred to China League One side Wuhan Zall with a fee of ¥3,500,000. After only one season and the chance to join another top tier club, Liu left Wuhan to join Guizhou Renhe where he would make his debut in a league game on 7 March 2015 against Liaoning Whowin F.C. that ended in a 1–0 defeat. While he would establish himself as a regular within the team by making twenty eight appearances within the league he was unfortunately a member of the squad that saw the club relegated at the end of the 2015 league season. At the beginning of the  2016 league season the club would move cities to Beijing and rename themselves Beijing Renhe. Zhu would stay with the team and at the end of the  2017 league season he was part of the squad that gained promotion back into the top tier.

Liu moved to Chinese Super League side Tianjin TEDA in February 2019. He would make his debut in a league game on 8 March 2019 against Guangzhou Evergrande F.C. that ended in a 1–0 defeat.

Career statistics 
Statistics accurate as of match played 31 December 2020.

References

External links
 

1991 births
Living people
Chinese footballers
Footballers from Anhui
People from Bengbu
Shandong Taishan F.C. players
Wuhan F.C. players
Beijing Renhe F.C. players
Tianjin Jinmen Tiger F.C. players
Chinese Super League players
China League One players
Association football defenders